Ptychodon is a genus of small, air-breathing land snails, terrestrial pulmonate gastropod mollusks in the family Charopidae.

Species
Species within the genus Ptychodon include:
 Ptychodon schuppi

References

 Worldwide Mollusc Species Database

 
Charopidae
Taxonomy articles created by Polbot